1961 Ireland rugby union tour of South Africa. Between 1906 and 1960 South Africa had played Ireland on five occasions. However all of these games had been played in Ireland. In 1960 South Africa had beaten Ireland 8–3 at Lansdowne Road. The following year Ireland embarked on their first tour of South Africa. Among the touring party was Tony O'Reilly who had previously toured South Africa with the British Lions in 1955. The tour began with a full international at Newlands Stadium which Ireland lost 24–8. Tom Kiernan scored all of Ireland's points with a try, a conversion and a penalty. Four members of this touring party – Niall Brophy, Tom Kiernan, Syd Millar and Bill Mulcahy – would return to South Africa with the British Lions in 1962. Kiernan, Millar and Ronnie Dawson, as a coach, would also return with the Lions in 1968.

Matches
Scores and results list Ireland's points tally first.

Touring party

Manager: Noel F. Murphy
Honorary Assistant Manager: Tony O'Reilly
Captain: Ronnie Dawson

Backs

Forwards

See also
 Ireland vs South Africa at rugby union

References

Ireland national rugby union team tours
Rugby union tours of South Africa
Ireland tour
Rugby union tours of Zimbabwe
1961 in South African rugby union
1960–61 in Irish rugby union
1961–62 in Irish rugby union